Dancesport was an event at the 2007 Southeast Asian Games. The competition took place in the Auditorium of the Wongchawalitkul University, Amphoe Mueang Nakhon Ratchasima, Nakhon Ratchasima Province, Thailand.

Medalists

Standard

Latin American

Medal table

External links
Southeast Asian Games Official Results

2007 Southeast Asian Games events
2007
2007 in dancesport